In geometry, an essential manifold is a special type of closed manifold. The notion was first introduced explicitly by Mikhail Gromov.

Definition

A closed manifold M is called essential if its fundamental class [M] defines a nonzero element in the homology of its fundamental group , or more precisely in the homology of the corresponding Eilenberg–MacLane space K( 1), via the natural homomorphism
 
where n is the dimension of M.  Here the fundamental class is taken in homology with integer coefficients if the manifold is orientable, and in coefficients modulo 2, otherwise.

Examples

All closed surfaces (i.e. 2-dimensional manifolds) are essential with the exception of the 2-sphere S2.
Real projective space RPn is essential since the inclusion 

is injective in homology, where

is the Eilenberg–MacLane space of the finite cyclic group of order 2.
All compact aspherical manifolds are essential (since being aspherical means the manifold itself is already a K( 1))
In particular all compact hyperbolic manifolds are essential.
All lens spaces are essential.

Properties

The connected sum of essential manifolds is essential.
Any manifold which admits a map of nonzero degree to an essential manifold is itself essential.

References

See also

Gromov's systolic inequality for essential manifolds
Systolic geometry

Algebraic topology
Riemannian geometry
Differential geometry
Systolic geometry
Manifolds